The arboreal blind snake (Ramphotyphlops angusticeps) is a species of snake in the Typhlopidae family. The ramphotyphlops angusticeps is a snake native to the Solomon Islands.

References

Ramphotyphlops
Reptiles described in 1877
Taxa named by Wilhelm Peters